Nedaye eslam is an Iranian newspaper in Fars Province. The concessionaire of this magazine was Zia'eddin Tabatabaee and it was published in Shiraz since 1907.

See also
List of magazines and newspapers of Fars
List of newspapers in Iran

References

Newspapers published in Fars Province
Mass media in Fars Province
Magazines established in 1907
Persian-language magazines
Newspapers published in Qajar Iran